In automotive engineering the electronic differential is a form of differential, which provides the required torque for each driving wheel and allows different wheel speeds. It is used in place of the mechanical differential in multi-drive systems. When cornering, the inner and outer wheels rotate at different speeds, because the inner wheels describe a smaller turning radius.  The electronic differential uses the steering wheel command signal and the motor speed signals to control the power to each wheel so that all wheels are supplied with the torque they need.

Functional description

The classical automobile drivetrain is composed by a single Internal combustion engine providing torque to one or more driving wheels. The most common solution is to use a mechanical device to distribute torque to the wheels. This mechanical differential allows different wheel speeds when cornering.  With the emergence of electric vehicles new drive train configurations are possible. Multi-drive systems become easy to implement due to the large power density of electric motors. These systems, usually with one motor per driving wheel, need an additional top level controller which performs the same task as a mechanical differential.

The ED scheme has several advantages over a mechanical differential:
 simplicity - it avoids additional mechanical parts such as a gearbox or clutch;
 independent torque for each wheel allows additional capabilities (e.g., traction control, stability control);
 reconfigurable - it is reprogrammable in order to include new features or tuned according to the driver’s preferences;
 allows distributed regenerative braking;
 the torque is not limited by the wheel with least traction, as it is with a mechanical differential.
 faster response times;
 accurate knowledge of traction torque per wheel.

Applications

Several applications of this technology have proven successful and have increased vehicle performance. The application range is wide and includes the huge T 282B from Liebherr which is considered the world largest truck. This earth-hauling truck is driven by an electric propulsion system composed by two independent electric motors. These motors providing a maximum power of 2700 kW are controlled in order to adjust their speeds when cornering, thus increasing traction and reducing tire wear.
The Eliica is also equipped with electronic differential; this eight-wheeled electric vehicle is capable of driving up to 370 km/h whilst maintaining perfect torque control on each wheel. Smaller vehicles for traction purposes and System on Chip controllers for generic vehicular applications are also available.

References

Automotive transmission technologies
Vehicle technology
Mechanical power control